Longvilliers may refer to several communes in France:

 Longvilliers, Pas-de-Calais
 Longvilliers, Yvelines